Melanie Gebhardt (born 1994) is a German sprint canoeist.

She participated at the 2018 ICF Canoe Sprint World Championships, winning a medal.

References

External links

Living people
1988 births
German female canoeists
ICF Canoe Sprint World Championships medalists in kayak
People from Albstadt
Sportspeople from Tübingen (region)
Canoeists at the 2015 European Games
European Games competitors for Germany
Canoeists at the 2020 Summer Olympics
Olympic canoeists of Germany